Zomaria interruptolineana, the broken-lined zomarium, is a species of tortricid moth in the family Tortricidae.

The MONA or Hodges number for Zomaria interruptolineana is 2750.

References

Further reading

External links

 

Olethreutini